Big Money is a novel by P.G. Wodehouse, first published in the United States on 30 January 1931 by Doubleday, Doran, New York, and in the United Kingdom on 20 March 1931 by Herbert Jenkins, London. It was serialised in Collier's (US) from 20 September to 6 December 1930 and in the Strand Magazine (UK) between October 1930 and April 1931.

The story concerns two young men: Godfrey, Lord Biskerton ("Biscuit") and his one-time inseparable comrade John Beresford Conway ("Berry"), and their efforts to raise money and to woo their respective girls.

References

External links
The Russian Wodehouse Society's page, with a full list of characters

1931 British novels
Novels by P. G. Wodehouse
English novels
Works originally published in Collier's
Novels first published in serial form
Herbert Jenkins books
Doubleday, Doran books
British comedy novels